St. Albert Soccer Association Impact FC is a Canadian women's soccer team based in St. Albert, Alberta that plays in United Women's Soccer.

History

The St. Albert Soccer Association was founded in 1999 as a youth soccer club. The club is one of seven Alberta clubs to be a Canadian Soccer Association (CSA) National Youth License Member.

In 2021, the club joined the US-based pro-am United Women's Soccer as an expansion franchise, becoming the league's second Canadian club after Calgary Foothills WFC. The team's budget is $100,000-$150,000 depending on travel. Their initial season was in jeopardy, after missing the deadline to be approved by the Canadian Soccer Association to apply for cross-border play, but after being given a 24 hour extension, they were able to complete their registration. For their initial season, they were to play a shortened six-game season due to the COVID-19 pandemic. In their debut match, on July 2, they defeated Calgary Foothills 1-0. The match was the first all-Canadian UWS match.
Ultimately they were only able to play four of the six matches for the season.

Seasons

References

Women's soccer clubs in Canada
United Women's Soccer teams
St. Albert, Alberta
Soccer clubs in Alberta
Expatriated football clubs